Lebombo cycad is the common name for two closely related species of cycads native to the Lebombo Mountains:

Encephalartos lebomboensis
Encephalartos senticosus